Huaiji County is a county of western Guangdong province, People's Republic of China. It is under the administration of Zhaoqing City.

Administrative divisions

Climate

References

Zhaoqing
County-level divisions of Guangdong